The babysitter and the man upstairs—also known as the babysitter or the sitter—is an urban legend that dates back to the 1960s about a teenage girl babysitting children who receives telephone calls from a stalker who continually asks her to "check the children". The basic story line has been adapted a number of times in movies. The 1950 murder of teenage babysitter Janett Christman is commonly cited as a source of the legend.

The legend 

The legend details a teenage girl who is watching television at night while babysitting after the children have been put to bed upstairs. The phone rings; the unknown caller tells her, "Check the children." The girl dismisses the call, but the anonymous caller dials back several times, and the girl becomes increasingly frightened. Eventually, the babysitter calls the police, who inform her they will trace the next call. After the stranger calls again, the police return her call, advising her to leave immediately. She evacuates the home and the police meet her to explain that the calls were coming from inside the house and that the unidentified prowler was calling her after killing the children upstairs.

Other versions 
Some variants of the story have one or more of these details:

 In more modern versions, rather than be tormented by menacing phone calls, the babysitter is unnerved by what she assumes to be a hideous, life-sized statue of a clown in the corner of the room. When the mother or father of the children she is caring for calls home to check in, the babysitter asks if she can cover the clown statue with a blanket. The parent informs the babysitter they do not own a clown statue: the "statue" was really a murderer, who attacks and kills the girl before she can escape.
 In more child-friendly versions, the caller turns out to be either one of the children or an elder sibling who decided to scare the babysitter as a prank and they get told off by the police.
 The babysitter is also killed.
 The babysitter manages to rescue the children and the prowler gets arrested by the police; however, in most versions the children do not survive.
 While being taken away by the police, the prowler whispers or says out loud "See you soon!" to the babysitter.
 In some versions, when the prowler calls the babysitter, he just makes scary noises like giggling or heavy breathing. Also in this version, when the operator says that the calls have been coming from the same house, the phone goes quiet, and when the operator asks if the babysitter is still there, all they get is the same scary noises, meaning that the babysitter has already been killed.
 The children are with the babysitter while watching television. The prowler starts phoning them, saying that he'll be with them in a decreasing amount of time. Then after they get the news that the calls are coming from inside the house, they hear a door upstairs opening and then the sound of footsteps heading towards the room where they are. This version can be found in the Scary Stories to Tell in the Dark books.
 Years later, the babysitter is now an adult and has a family of her own. One evening, she and her husband go to have dinner out while a babysitter looks after the children. The evening is going well until a waiter approaches their table and says that there is a phone call for her. She then answers the phone and hears "Did you check the children?". This is an ending that appears in some of the movie versions.
 The police inform one of the children that they found the prowler under the kid's bed holding a weapon.

Use in film 
 Foster's Release (1971)
 The Severed Arm (1973)
 Black Christmas (1974)
 O Anjo da Noite (1974)
 The Sitter (1977)
 When a Stranger Calls (1979)
 When a Stranger Calls Back (1993)
 Black Christmas (2006)
 When a Stranger Calls (2006)
 When a Killer Calls (2006)
 Amusement (2008)

References

External links 
 The babysitter and the man upstairs at Snopes

American legends
Fiction about child care occupations
Urban legends